The 2010 Star Mazda Championship was the twelfth season of the Star Mazda Championship, an open wheel auto racing series that competes using spec chassis and engines. It was the third season under the sanctioning of the International Motor Sports Association and the first under the Indy Racing League's new Road to Indy ladder.

Conor Daly became series champion after finishing in the top four positions in each of the twelve races prior to clinching the title at Mosport International Raceway. At the same meeting, Carlos Conde sealed the Masters title for drivers over 45 years of age, while J. W. Roberts secured the Expert title for drivers between 30 and 44 at Trois-Rivières.

Drivers and teams

Race calendar and results
The calendar was announced on November 23, 2009. The new partnership with the IRL begins with three weekends shared with the IndyCar Series and Indy Lights including a race at O'Reilly Raceway Park at Indianapolis the night before the Indianapolis 500. Star Mazda will also support the two series in St. Petersburg and at Iowa Speedway. Five races will support the American Le Mans Series, and will also join the Continental Tire Sports Car Challenge at Trois-Rivières.

Championship standings

Drivers'

Teams'

References

External links
 Star Mazda Championship Official website

Star Mazda Championship
Indy Pro 2000 Championship